Probodh Dutt (born 10 June 1917) was an Indian cricketer. He played seven first-class matches for Bengal between 1935 and 1944.

See also
 List of Bengal cricketers

References

External links
 

1917 births
Year of death missing
Indian cricketers
Bengal cricketers
Cricketers from Kolkata